The sole sports Museum of Nepal, Nepal Olympic Museum, envisioned by its founder/president Chhitij Arun Shrestha, has been in existence since 1999 inside the premise of the National Sports Council, during the 8th South Asian Games Kathmandu. Affiliated to National Sports Council and Nepal Olympic Committee, and with the primary objective of Historical Conservation for Sports Development and contributing to the Olympic Movement by preserving historic objects and items that were once a part of Nepalese Sports, the Museum, is a national asset of every Nepalese sport enthusiast and purely a sports organization. It is evident that since its existence, the museum despite it ups and downs have been involved in variety of activities in the service of Nepalese sports.

History
The museum was officially registered as Sports Nepal Olympic Museum (NOM) on 23 June 1995 (2052/03/09B.S). The Museum is affiliated to National Sports Council (NSC) & Nepal Olympic Committee (NOC). The name was later changed to Nepal Olympic Museum (NOM). The sole purpose of establishing this museum has been to preserve various Nepalese sports related objects of historical significance and assemble them at one place.

Collection
The number and the value of sports related materials existing in Nepal by now have become large enough to be put on display in a separate museum. Unfortunately, most of those materials at this time lie unattended and scattered all over the place gathering rust.

See also
Nepal Olympic Committee
National Sports Council (Nepal)
National Games of Nepal
Nepal at the Olympics
Nepal at the Paralympics
South Asian Games
Asian Games

References

Sport in Nepal
1994 establishments in Nepal
Olympic museums